This is a list of golfers who have won five or more events on the Asian Tour since its founding in 1995. 

Many of the players on the list have won events on other tours and unofficial events or won tournaments that have been Asian Tour events but were not part of the Asian Tour schedule at the time.

This list is up to date as of 6 November 2022.

Notes

External links
Asian Tour's official site

Asian Tour
 
Asian Tour
Golf in Asia